Kristen "Kris" Krull (born 1953) is a beauty queen from Niagara Falls, New York who has competed in the Miss America pageant.

Krull won the Miss New York 1974 title and represented New York at the Miss America 1975 pageant held in Atlantic City, New Jersey.  She performed in two Miss America USO troupes across Europe and southeast Asia.

She became Kris Coleman, and a school nurse in Sun Valley, California.

References

External links
Miss America official website

1953 births
Living people
Miss America 1975 delegates
People from Niagara Falls, New York
Miss New York winners
American nurses
American women nurses
People from Sun Valley, Los Angeles
20th-century American people
21st-century American women